Trifurcula thymi is a moth of the family Nepticulidae. It is found from Germany and Poland to the Alps and Hungary, as well as in France and the Iberian Peninsula.

The larvae feed on Satureja cuneifolia, Satureja montana, Thymus camphoratus, Thymus glabrescens, Thymus mastichina, Thymus pannonicus, Thymus pulegioides and Thymus vulgaris. They mine the leaves of their host plant. The mine consists of a narrow corridor that winds through the leaf, then moves to the leaf opposite through the bark of the stem. This second leaf is completely mined out in two or three loops. The frass is deposited in a relatively broad central line.

External links
bladmineerders.nl
Fauna Europaea

Nepticulidae
Moths of Europe
Moths described in 1965